A discrete global grid (DGG) is a mosaic that covers the entire Earth's surface.
Mathematically it is a space partitioning: it consists of a set of non-empty regions that form a partition of the Earth's surface.  In a usual grid-modeling strategy, to simplify position calculations, each region is represented by a point, abstracting the grid as a set of region-points.  Each region or region-point in the grid  is called a cell.

When each cell of a grid is subject to a recursive partition, resulting in a "series of discrete global grids with progressively finer resolution", forming a hierarchical grid, it is called a hierarchical DGG (sometimes "global hierarchical tessellation"
or "DGG system").

Discrete global grids are used as the geometric basis for the building of geospatial data structures. Each cell is related with data objects or values, or (in the hierarchical case)  may be associated with other cells. DGGs have been proposed for use in a wide range of geospatial applications, including vector and raster location representation, data fusion, and spatial databases.

The most usual grids are for horizontal position representation, using a standard  datum, like WGS84. In this context, it is common also to use a specific DGG as foundation for geocoding standardization.

In the context of a spatial index, a DGG can assign unique identifiers to each grid cell, using it for spatial indexing purposes, in geodatabases or for geocoding.

Reference model of the globe 

The "globe", in the DGG concept, has no strict semantics, but in geodesy a so-called "grid reference system" is a  grid that divides space with precise positions relative to a  datum, that is an approximated a "standard model of the Geoid".  So, in the role of Geoid, the "globe" covered by a DGG can be any of the following  objects:

 The  topographical surface of the Earth, when each cell of the grid has its surface-position coordinates and the elevation in relation to the standard Geoid. Example: grid with coordinates  (φ,λ,z) where z is the elevation.
 A standard Geoid surface. The z coordinate is zero for all grid, thus can be omitted,  (φ,λ). Ancient standards, before 1687  (the Newton's Principia publication), used a "reference sphere"; in nowadays the Geoid is mathematically abstracted as reference ellipsoid.
 A simplified Geoid: sometimes an old geodesic standard (e.g. SAD69) or a non-geodesic surface (e. g. perfectly spherical surface) must be adopted, and will be covered by the grid. In this case, cells must be labeled with non-ambiguous way, (φ',λ'), and the transformation (φ,λ) ⟾ (φ′,λ′) must be known.
 A projection surface. Typically the geographic coordinates (φ,λ) are projected (with some distortion) onto the 2D mapping plane with 2D Cartesian coordinates (x, y).

As a global modeling process, modern DGGs, when including projection process, tend to avoid surfaces like cylinder or a conic solids that result in discontinuities and indexing problems. Regular polyhedra and other topological equivalents of sphere led to the most promising known options to be covered by DGGs, because "spherical projections preserve the correct topology of the Earth – there are no singularities or discontinuities to deal with".

When working with a DGG it is important to specify which of these options was adopted. So, the characterization of the reference model of the globe of a DGG can be summarized by:

  The recovered object: the object type in the role of globe. If there is no projection, the object covered by the grid is the Geoid, the Earth or a sphere; else is the geometry class of the projection surface (e.g. a cylinder, a cube or a cone).
 Projection type:  absent (no projection) or present. When present, its characterization can be summarized by the projection's goal property (e.g. equal-area, conformal, etc.) and the class of the corrective function (e.g. trigonometric, linear, quadratic, etc.).

NOTE: when the DGG is covering a projection surface, in a context of data provenance, the metadata about reference-Geoid is also important — typically informing its ISO 19111's CRS value, with no confusion with the projection surface.

Types and examples 
The main distinguishing feature to classify or compare DGGs is the use or not of hierarchical grid structures:

 In hierarchical reference systems each cell is a "box reference" to a subset of cells, and cell identifiers can express this hierarchy in its numbering logic or structure.
 In non-hierarchical reference systems each cell have a distinct identifier and represents a fixed-scale region of the space. The discretization of the Latitude/Longitude system  is the most popular, and the standard reference for conversions.

Other usual criteria to classify a DGG are tile-shape and granularity (grid resolution):

 Tile regularity and shape:  there are regular, semi-regular  or irregular grid. As in generic tilings by regular polygons,  is possible to tiling with regular face (like wall tiles can be rectangular, triangular, hexagonal, etc.), or with same face type but changing its size or angles, resulting in semi-regular shapes. Uniformity of shape and regularity of metrics provide better grid-indexing algorithms. Although it has less practical use, totally irregular grids are possible, such in a Voronoi coverage.
 Fine or coarse granulation (cell size): modern DGGs are parametrizable in its grid resolution, so, it is a characteristic of the final DGG instance, but not useful to classify DGGs, except when the DGG-type must use a specific resolution or have a discretization limit. A "fine" granulation grid is non-limited and "coarse" refers to drastic limitation. Historically the main limitations are related to digital/analogic media, the compression/expanded representations of the grid in a database, and the memory limitations to store the grid. When  a quantitative characterization is necessary, the average area of the grid cells or average distance between cell centers can be adopted.

Non-hierarchical grids  

The most common class of discrete global grids are those that place cell center points on longitude/latitude meridians and parallels, or which use the longitude/latitude meridians and parallels to form the boundaries of rectangular cells. Examples of such grids, all based on latitude/longitude:

Hierarchical grids 

The right aside illustration show 3  boundary maps of the  coast of Great Britain. The first map was covered by a grid-level-0 with 150 km size cells. Only a grey cell in the center, with no need of zoom for detail, remains level-0; all other cells of the second map was partitioned into four-cells-grid (grid-level-1), each with 75 km. In the third map 12 cells level-1 remains as grey, all other was partitioned again, each level-1-cell transformed into a level-2-grid. Examples of DGGs that use such recursive process, generating hierarchical grids, include:

Standard equal-area hierarchical grids 
There is a class of hierarchical DGG's named by the Open Geospatial Consortium (OGC) as "discrete global grid systems" (DGGS), that must to satisfy 18 requirements. Among them, what best distinguishes this class from other hierarchical DGGs, is the Requirement-8, "For each successive level of grid refinement, and for each cell geometry, (...) Cells that are equal area (...) within the specified level of precision".

A DGGS is designed as a framework for information as distinct from conventional coordinate reference systems originally designed for navigation. For a grid-based global spatial information framework to operate effectively as an analytical system it should be constructed using cells that represent the surface of the Earth uniformly. The DGGS standard include in its requirements a set of functions and operations that the framework must to offer.

All DGGS's level-0 cells are equal area faces of a Regular polyhedra...

Database modeling 

There are many DGGs because there are many representational, optimization and modeling alternatives. All DGG grid is a composition of its cells, and, in the Hierarchical DGG each cell uses a new grid over its local region.

The illustration is not adequate to TIN DEM cases and similar "raw data" structures, where the database not use the cell concept (that geometrically is the triangular region), but nodes and edges: each node is an elevation and each edge is the distance between two nodes.

In general, each cell of the DGG is identified by the coordinates of its region-point (illustrated as the centralPoint of a database representation). It is also possible, with loss of functionality, to use a "free identifier", that is, any unique number or unique symbolic label per cell, the cell ID. The ID is usually used as spatial index (such as internal Quadtree or k-d tree), but is also possible to transform ID into a human-readable label for  geocoding applications.

Modern databases (e.g. using S2 grid) use also multiple representations for the same data, offering both, a grid (or cell region) based in the Geoid and a grid-based in the projection.

The DGGS framework 
The standard defines the requirements of a hierarchical DGG, including how to operate the grid. Any DGG that satisfies these requirements can be named DGGS.  "A  DGGS specification SHALL include a DGGS Reference Frame and the associated Functional  Algorithms as defined by the DGGS Core Conceptual Data Model".
 For an Earth grid system to be compliant with this Abstract Specification it must define a hierarchical tessellation of equal area cells that both partition the entire Earth at multiple levels of granularity and provide a global spatial reference frame. The system must also include encoding methods to: address each cell; assign quantized data to cells; and perform algebraic operations on the cells and the data assigned to them. Main concepts of the DGGS Core Conceptual Data Model:

 reference frame elements, and,
 functional algorithm elements; comprising:
 quantization operations,
 algebraic operations, and
 interoperability operations.

History 
Discrete global grids with cell regions defined by parallels and meridians of latitude/longitude have been used since the earliest days of global geospatial computing. Before it, the discretization of continuous coordinates for practical purposes, with paper maps, occurred only with low granularity.  Perhaps the most representative and main example of DGG of this pre-digital era was the 1940s military UTM DGGs, with finer granulated cell identification for geocoding purposes. Similarly some hierarchical grid exists before geospatial computing, but only in coarse granulation.

A global surface is not required for use on daily geographical maps, and the memory was very expensive before the 2000s, to put all planetary data into the same computer. The first digital global grids were used for data processing of the satellite images and global (climatic and oceanographic) fluid dynamics modeling.

The first published references to hierarchical geodesic DGG systems are to systems developed for atmospheric modeling and published in 1968. These systems have hexagonal cell regions created on the surface of a spherical icosahedron.

The spatial hierarchical grids were subject to more intensive studies in the 1980s, when main structures, as Quadtree, were adapted in image indexing and databases.

While specific instances of these grids have been in use for decades, the term discrete global grids was coined by researchers at Oregon State University in 1997 to describe the class of all such entities.

... OGC standardization in 2017...

Comparison and evolution 

The evaluation discrete global grid consists of many aspects, including area, shape, compactness, etc.
Evaluation methods for map projection, such as Tissot's indicatrix, are also suitable for evaluating map projection-based discrete global grid.

In addition, averaged ratio between complementary profiles (AveRaComp)  gives a good evaluation of shape distortions for quadrilateral-shaped discrete global grid.

Database development-choices and adaptations are oriented by practical demands for greater performance, reliability or precision. The best choices are being selected and adapted to necessities,  propitiating the evolution of the DGG architectures. Examples of this evolution process: from  non-hierarchical to hierarchical DGGs; from the use of Z-curve indexes (a naive algorithm based in digits-interlacing), used by Geohash, to Hilbert-curve indexes, used in modern optimizations, like S2.

Geocode variants 

In general each cell of the grid is identified by the coordinates of its region-point, but it is also possible to simplify the coordinate syntax and semantics, to obtain an identifier, as in a classic alphanumeric grids — and find the coordinates of a region-point from its identifier. 
Small and fast coordinate representations is a goal in the cell-ID implementations, for any DGG solutions.

There is no loss of functionality when using a "free identifier" instead of a coordinate, that is, any unique number (or unique symbolic label) per region-point, the cell ID.  So, to transform a coordinate into a human-readable label, and/or compressing the length of the label, is an additional step in the grid representation. This representation is named geocode.

Some popular "global place codes" as ISO 3166-1 alpha-2 for administrative regions or Longhurst code for ecological regions of the globe, are partial in globe's coverage.  By other hand, any set of cell-identifiers of a specific DGG can be used as "full-coverage place codes". Each different set of IDs, when used as a standard for data interchange purposes, are named "geocoding system".
 
There are many ways to represent the value of a cell identifier (cell-ID) of a grid: structured or monolithic, binary or not, human-readable or not. Supposing a map feature, like the Singapore's Merlion fountaine (~5m scale feature), represented by its minimum bounding cell or a center-point-cell, the cell ID will be:

All these geocodes represents the same position in the globe,  with similar precision,  but differ in string-length, separators-use and alphabet (non-separator characters).   
In some cases the "original DGG" representation can be used. The variants are minor changes, affecting only final representation, for example the base of the numeric representation, or interlacing parts of the structured into only one number or code representation. The most popular variants are used for geocoding applications.

Alphanumeric global grids 
DGGs and its variants, with human-readable cell-identifiers, has been used as de facto standard for alphanumeric grids.  It is not limited to alphanumeric symbols, but "alphanumeric" is the most usual term.

Geocodes are notations for locations, and in a DGG context, notations to express grid cell IDs. There are a continuous evolution in digital standards and DGGs, so a continuous change in the popularity of each geocoding convention in the last years. Broader adoption also depends on country's government adoption, use in popular mapping platforms, and many other factors.

Examples used in the following list are about "minor grid cell" containing the Washington obelisk, 38° 53′ 22.11″ N, 77° 2′ 6.88″ W.

Other documented systems:

See also 

 Grid reference
 Geodesic grid
 List of geocoding systems
 Military Grid Reference System

References

External links 
OGC DGGS Standards Working Group
Discrete Global Grids page at the Computer Science department at Southern Oregon University
BUGS climate model  page on geodesic grids
Research Institute for World Grid squares page on World Grid Squares
Cubic Postcode a valid protocol for an international postcode system using a grid of cubic metres
Earth grid models for exhibition use. 3D-printable models of some Earth grids.

Geographic coordinate systems